Albert Abraham Goodman (3 September 1890 – 7 December 1959) was an English professional footballer who played for London Fields, Tufnell Park , Tottenham Thursday, Maidstone United, Croydon Common, Tottenham Hotspur, Margate, Charlton Athletic, Gillingham, Clapton Orient and Guildford City.

Football career 
Goodman played for non-League teams London Fields, Tufnell Park, Tottenham Thursday, Maidstone United and Croydon Common before joining Tottenham Hotspur in 1919 where he played 17 matches and scored one goal in all competitions. After leaving the Lilywhites he played for Margate. In 1921 he signed for Charlton Athletic and featured in 136 matches and found the net on 15 occasions. He went on to make appearances at Gillingham, Clapton Orient and finally at Guildford City.

References 

1890 births
1959 deaths
Footballers from the London Borough of Hackney
English footballers
Association football forwards
Association football utility players
Tufnell Park F.C. players
Croydon Common F.C. players
Maidstone United F.C. (1897) players
Tottenham Hotspur F.C. players
Margate F.C. players
Charlton Athletic F.C. players
Gillingham F.C. players
Leyton Orient F.C. players
Guildford City F.C. players
Southern Football League players
English Football League players
People from Dalston